Simon Howard Wootton (born 24 February 1959 in Perivale, Middlesex), is a former English first-class cricketer who played for Warwickshire between 1981 and 1983, and for Gloucestershire in 1984. He also played List A cricket for Warwickshire.

References

1959 births
Living people
English cricketers
Warwickshire cricketers
Gloucestershire cricketers
Cricketers from Greater London